Cameron Henderson (born 13 January 2000 in Hong Kong) is a Scottish rugby union player for Leicester Tigers in England's Premiership Rugby. His usual position is lock. He was previously a stage 3 Scottish Rugby Academy player assigned to Glasgow Warriors.

Rugby Union career

Amateur career

Henderson was born in Hong Kong in 2000. His Scottish father, Russel, was resident in Hong Kong working as a loss adjuster.  He started his rugby union career in Hong Kong as a colt for Hong Kong FC.

Henderson came to Scotland from Hong Kong in 2013.  He played rugby union for Strathallan School in Perthshire. He was in the team that won the Scottish Schools Cup of 2017-2018 season, beating Glenalmond College in the final.

Henderson joined the Scottish Rugby Academy in the 2017-18 season as a Stage 2 supported player.

Henderson played for Stirling County in the Scottish Premiership.

Professional career

Henderson graduated to be a Stage 3 player in the Fosroc Scottish Rugby Academy for the 2018-19 season. Stage 3 players are given a professional contract by the Academy. He was placed in the Caledonia academy and assigned to Glasgow Warriors for the season.

He signed for Leicester Tigers on 10 April 2020.  Henderson made his Leicester debut on 22 August 2020 as a replacement in a game against Bath at Welford Road, and scored his first try a week later against Gloucester at Kingsholm.

International career

Henderson has played for Scotland U18. In June 2021 Henderson was called up to the Scotland squad for the Summer internationals.

References

External links
 

Living people
Scottish rugby union players
Glasgow Warriors players
2000 births
Stirling County RFC players
Leicester Tigers players
People educated at Strathallan School
Rugby union locks